Simon is an American sitcom television series created by Danny Jacobson, that aired on The WB from September 10, 1995 to March 24, 1996.

Premise
A former Wall Street stockbroker moves to Harlem to live with his simple brother Simon.

Cast
Harland Williams as Simon Himple
Jason Bateman as Carl Himple
Andrea Bendewald as Libby Keeler
Patrick Breen as Mitch Lowen
Paxton Whitehead as Duke Stone

Episodes

External links

1995 American television series debuts
1996 American television series endings
1990s American sitcoms
English-language television shows
The WB original programming
Television shows set in New York City
Television series by Sony Pictures Television